Eunidia olivacea is a species of beetle in the family Cerambycidae. It was described by Stephan von Breuning in 1954. It contains the varietas Eunidia olivacea var. trialbosignata.

References

Eunidiini
Beetles described in 1954